Preston Grasshoppers Rugby Football Club is an English rugby union team from Preston, Lancashire. The men's senior team play in the RFU National League 2 North, a level 4 league in the RFU league pyramid.

History
The club was founded on 28 September 1869 at a meeting held at the Bull Hotel, Preston, making it one of the oldest 'northern' rugby union teams.

The club were based at Farringdon Park (modern day Farringdon Crescent), New Hall Lane from 1924 until 1932, on the site of an old amusement park and cycling track. In 1929 the club agreed a six-year sub-tenancy with Preston speedway team, and a dirt track was constructed around the perimeter of the rugby pitch. The speedway syndicate folded in 1932 but a greyhound syndicate paid the Grasshoppers £2,000 (a huge sum at the time) to vacate the ground the same year.

While many notable players have played for the team before going onto play professionally (both in the Premiership and for England), Preston's most famous player is lock Wade Dooley. Nicknamed 'the Blackpool Tower', Dooley played for Grasshoppers in the 1980s and 90s (before rugby turned professional) and whilst working in the Lancashire Constabulary. Dooley gained 58 Test caps- 55 for England and 3 for the British & Irish Lions. The main room at Grasshopper's modern ground, Lightfoot Green Lane, is named the Dooley Suite after him.

When the national league structure was introduced in the mid nineties, Hoppers remained in National League 3 (North) until their promotion in the 1998–99 season. This was achieved with the help of Australian Michael Lough and winger Ian Bruce who, between them, scored over 50 tries.

In 2013, Preston Grasshoppers 2nd team won the Preston Sports Awards Team Performance of the Year.
At the end of the 2015–16 Season Preston Grasshoppers accepted an offer from the RFU to replace the grass surface at Lightfoot Green Lane with an artificial 3G pitch. The terms of the agreement mean that the RFU have exclusive use of the pitch for the next thirty years.

In 2017–18 the club made an immediate return to National 2 North by winning the Northern Premier League at the first attempt. Under head coach Paul Arnold, the side were the stand out side in the division with number 8 Matthew Lamprey scoring 32 league tries during the campaign to set a new club record for tries in a league season, beating the previous best of 27 set by Michael Lough in the 1998–99 National 2 North championship winning season.

After a mid-table finish in National 2 North in the 2018–19 season, the club suffered an injury decimated season that resulted in relegation in a shortened season due to the COVID-19 pandemic. No play was available at all in the 2020–21 season due to the pandemic but the team rebounded to National Two by finishing runners-up in the Northern Premier Division in the 2021–22 season. They also won the Lancashire Cup to crown a superb season. 

Joel Unsworth succeeded Arnold as head coach for the 2022-23 season. Grasshoppers now compete in the restructured National League 2 North.

Honours 
 Jewson National League 2 North champions: 1998–99
 Lancashire Cup winners (3): 2003, 2006, 2012, 2022
 North Premier champions (2): 2004–05, 2017–18, 
 North Premier runner-up: 2021–22 (promoted)

Notable former players

England 
The following players have made appearances for England whilst playing for Grasshoppers:

 Wade Dooley (1985-1993, 58 appearances, 3 tries)

The following players have made appearances for England after playing for Grasshoppers:

 A. N. Hornby (1887-1882, 9 appearances, 1 try)
 Paul Grayson (1995-2004, 32 appearances, 2 tries)
 Will Greenwood (1997-2004, 55 appearances, 31 tries)
 Pat Sanderson (1998-2007, 16 appearances, 1 try)
 Iain Balshaw (2000-2008, 35 appearances, 13 tries)
 Steve Borthwick (2001-2010, 57 appearances, 2 tries)
 Alex Sanderson (2001-2003, 5 appearances, 1 try)

The following players have coached England after playing or coaching Grasshoppers:

 Dick Greenwood (1983-1985)
 Steve Borthwick (2022-present)

Ireland 
The following players have made appearances for Ireland after playing for Grasshoppers:

 Mike Haley (2019, 1 appearance)

British & Irish Lions 
The following players have made appearances for the British & Irish Lions whilst playing for Grasshoppers:

 Wade Dooley (1989 and 1993, 3 appearances)

The following players have made appearances for the Lions after playing for Grasshoppers:

 Will Greenwood (1997, 2001, 2005, 2 appearances)
 Iain Balshaw (2001 and 2005, 3 appearances)

Other notable players 
The following people have made appearances for Grasshoppers:

 James Vaughan (footballer)
 Sean Long (rugby league player)

Current standings

References

External links
Official website

English rugby union teams
1869 establishments in England
Rugby clubs established in 1869
Sport in Preston
Rugby union in Lancashire